Jagjit Singh Jallah is an international rowing competitor from the state of Punjab, India. Singh was born in the village of Jallah, Ludhiana, Punjab. He is the first Punjabi to receive an Arjuna award in rowing. He works for the Punjab police.

Awards

Achievements

Asian Games

Bombay Sappers

Maharaja Ratan Singh Awardee

Arjuna Awardee

Other

References

Indian male rowers
Living people
1966 births
Asian Games medalists in rowing
Rowers at the 1994 Asian Games
Rowers at the 1998 Asian Games
Asian Games bronze medalists for India
Medalists at the 1994 Asian Games
Medalists at the 1998 Asian Games
Recipients of the Arjuna Award